, released in 1982, is Yukihiro Takahashi's fourth solo album. As well as his YMO bandmates Ryuichi Sakamoto and Haruomi Hosono, this album features guest appearances by Zaine Griff, Tony Mansfield, and Bill Nelson.

In Japan this album reached No. 35 on the Oricon LP chart.

Track listing

Personnel
Yukihiro Takahashi - Keyboards, Drums, Percussion, Vocals, Producer
Haruomi Hosono - Bass, Vocals
Ryuichi Sakamoto - Keyboards
Bill Nelson - Guitar, E-Bow
Zaine Griff - Vocals
Tony Mansfield - Vocals
Mitsuru Sawamura - Saxophone
Kohji Ueno - Keyboards
Ronny - Vocals
Hiroshi Sato - Keyboards
Kenji Omura - Guitar
Hajime Tachibana - Artwork, Design
Julian Mendelsohn - Engineer
Mitsuo Koike - Engineer
Steve Nye - Engineer 
Yoshifumi Iio - Engineer
Akitsugu Doi - Assistant Engineer
Jeremy Allom - Assistant Engineer
Stuart Bruce - Assistant Engineer

References

External links 

1982 albums
Yukihiro Takahashi albums
Alfa Records albums

ja:WHAT, ME WORRY?